Binham is a village and a civil parish in the English county of Norfolk.

The nearest railway station is at Sheringham for the Bittern Line which runs between Cromer and Norwich. The nearest airport is Norwich International Airport.

For the purposes of local government, the parish falls within the district of North Norfolk.

History

Binham has an entry in the Domesday Book of 1085. In the great book Binham is recorded by the names Benincham, and Bin(n)eham. The main landholder was Peter de Valognes. The survey mentions that there were two mills in the parish.

The villages name either means 'Bynna's homestead/village' or 'Bynna's hemmed-in land'.

Between 2009 - 2023 a series of archaeological test pits were dug.  The report was published in 2017.

Binham Priory and Saint Mary Parish Church
Close to the village are the remains of the Benedictine St Mary's Priory. Today the nave of the much larger priory church has become the Church of Saint Mary and the Holy Cross and is still used as a place of worship. The remains of the priory are in the care of English Heritage.  Both are Grade I listed buildings .

Binham Market Cross
It is one of the best surviving examples of a medieval standing cross in Norfolk. It is situated on the triangular green in the centre of the village near the church. The 15th-century cross is built of Barnack limestone and consists of a socket stone and separate shaft. The 2-metre tall base is made of mortared flint rubble with stepped courses of stone blocks, capped by a platform of thin slabs. 
The weathered remains of an ornamental moulding can still be seen partway up the shaft, but the stone cross that originally topped the shaft is missing.
Many cross-heads were destroyed by iconoclasts during the 16th and 17th centuries. Following the grant of a charter by King Henry I granted the village a charter, so that an annual fair and a weekly market could be held here from the early 12th century, and fairs were allowed to be convened on the green until the early 1950s.

Binham Pride
Organised by members of the cast of the Thursford Christmas Spectacular, Binham has been the home of a Pride event since 2014. 'Binham Pride' started as a joke between members of the cast that were staying in Binham during their employment at the Thursford Christmas 2014 Spectacular. In two weeks they decided to throw the event for real and 'Binham Pride' was officially born; a celebration of Diversity and Inclusion.
The first Event was on Monday 1 December - World AIDS day at Binham Memorial Hall and saw around 70 people attend - mostly those who were part of the Thursford show. The evening raised £2000 for the Terrence Higgins Trust.
In 2015 it grew larger. Around 100 people attended - a handful of whom were from local communities who had heard about the event through the Chequers Inn and social media posts. The  2015 event raised £4000 for the Terrence Higgins Trust. The 2016 event fell on Monday 28 November and around 150 people attended - around 40 of whom were locals and raised just over £5000 for the Terrence Higgins Trust. The  2017 event was the most successful and raised the largest amount to date. After a 2 year hiatus, Binham Pride returned on December 5th 2022. To date, Binham Pride has raised over £36000 for The Terrence Higgins Trust.

War Memorial
Binham's war memorial is a Celtic cross monument located in the grounds of Binham Priory. It holds the following names for the First World War:
 Sergeant Bertie J. Fickling MM (d.1918), 10th Battalion, Essex Regiment
 Sergeant Thomas S. C. Youngman MM (1897-1916), 8th Battalion, Royal Norfolk Regiment
 Corporal Wallace E. Clark (1882-1916), Royal Army Service Corps
 Private Bertie Bunnett (1897-1916), 10th Battalion, Border Regiment
 Private Henry H. Wyer (d.1918), 1st Battalion, Royal Norfolk Regiment
 Private Edward E. Hooke (1895-1916), 2nd Battalion, Royal Norfolk Regiment
 Private Harry R. Neale (d.1917), 7th Battalion, Royal Norfolk Regiment
 Private Alec G. Curson (1896-1916), 8th Battalion, Royal Norfolk Regiment
 Private Herbert G. Grange (1896-1916), 8th Battalion, Royal Norfolk Regiment
 Private William H. Males (1895-1916), 8th Battalion, Royal Norfolk Regiment
 Private E. E. Coe (d.1915), 2nd Battalion, Yorkshire Regiment

And, the following for the Second World War:
 Sergeant Francis E. A. Rivett (1922-1943), No. 576 Squadron RAF
 Corporal Cecil R. Kendle (1920-1942), 5th Battalion, Royal Norfolk Regiment
 Gunner Reginald J. Manning (1907-1940), 5th Regiment, Royal Horse Artillery
 H. Baxter
 F. Taplin

References

External links

Information from Genuki Norfolk on Binham.
http://kepn.nottingham.ac.uk/map/place/Norfolk/Binham

Villages in Norfolk
Civil parishes in Norfolk
North Norfolk